This list presents the vital statistics of the pyramids listed in chronological order, when available.

See also
 Egyptian pyramids
 Great Sphinx of Giza
 Lepsius list of pyramids
 List of Egyptian pyramidia
 List of the oldest buildings in the world
 Umm El Qa'ab

References and notes

Bibliography 

 
Pyramids, Egyptian
Pyramids
Pyramids in Egypt